The Edinburgh Monarchs are a Scottish Speedway team, currently based in Armadale. They compete in the SGB Championship, racing on Friday nights during the speedway season. The club is run by a board of directors, chaired by Alex Harkess. The club also runs a National Development League team called the Monarchs Academy (formerly the Armadale Devils).

History
The club was founded in 1928 and operated at Marine Gardens, Portobello in 1929, 1930, 1931, 1938 and 1939. A few team matches were staged in 1929 and an Edinburgh team competed in the Northern League in 1930. The Edinburgh team of 1938 and 1939 was known as The Thistles and they staged a number of challenge matches.

1948 to 1969: Meadowbank and Coatbridge 
After the Second World War, Marine Gardens was not available and the potential of Old Meadowbank, then the home of Leith Athletic F.C., was said to have been spotted by Ian Hoskins. The Monarchs (Meadowbank Monarchs) were re-established in 1948 by a consortium including Frank Varey, ex-rider and Sheffield promoter, and R.L.Rae, a local Edinburgh businessman.

The team operated at Old Meadowbank 1948 in the National League Second Division until midway through 1954. The team finished at the bottom of the league in 1948 but improved to a best place of third before closure in 1954. 
Under its promoter Ian Hoskins from 1960 until 1964 the Monarchs raced in the Provincial League and were founder members of the British League that ran from 1965 to 1967. The track was used for practice sessions between 1957 and 1959.

Old Meadowbank Stadium had been purchased by the City of Edinburgh Council from Leith Athletic in 1956. Following their successful bid to host the 1970 Commonwealth Games they decided to redevelop the site of the stadium and surrounding area.  The Monarchs were evicted as Speedway was not incorporated into the new Meadowbank Stadium plans due to the government of the day refusing to fund stadia which would be used by professional sports. The new stadium sits immediately west of Old Meadowbank essentially on the site of the old running track known as New Meadowbank. The team moved en bloc to a new track at Cliftonhill, Coatbridge (nearer to Glasgow than Edinburgh) and operated as the Coatbridge Monarchs for the 1968 and 1969 seasons before the track licence was sold to Wembley.

1977 to 1996: Powderhall and Shawfield 
Speedway returned to Edinburgh in 1977, with the Monarchs racing at Powderhall Stadium from 1977 until 1995. During the 1995 season, the company operating Powderhall ran into financial difficulty, and the stadium was sold to a housing company for redevelopment. This meant the Monarchs were again evicted.

In 1996, the Monarchs' rivals Glasgow Tigers closed down, so with a stadium not in use in Glasgow, and the Monarchs without a home in Edinburgh, the Monarchs' moved to Shawfield Stadium, Glasgow to form the Scottish Monarchs. Many Tigers fans refused to support what they saw as a team of old rivals, and although Monarchs fans initially travelled through to Glasgow, crowd numbers soon fell.

1997 onwards: Armadale 
In 1997, the Monarchs left Glasgow after gaining permission to operate at Armadale Stadium, where they continue to operate to this day.

The Monarchs have won the Premier League championship five times in their history, in 2003 again in 2008 in 2010, in 2014, and once more in 2015.

Edinburgh took part in the first Premier League Promotion Play-off in 2008 when they faced Wolverhampton. Although they put up a valiant fight, they lost the tie on aggregate. Despite finishing runners up in 2009 they faced Belle Vue in the Premier League Promotion Play-off losing both legs.

Recent plans of the supermarket chain Sainsburys to redevelop Armadale Stadium fell through after the planning application was rejected.

Edinburgh secured another Premier League title in the 2010 season, their third in seven years. The Championship was secured by winning away at Stoke's Loomer Road track, with Edinburgh riders Ryan Fisher and Kevin Wölbert going through the card unbeaten.

The Monarchs lost out on another League Championship in 2013 losing narrowly to winners Somerset, though took some consolation by securing the Premier League Fours.

The 2014 Monarchs had a very successful season winning the Premier League Cup, the Knock Out Cup and the Premier League, while going on a 27 match unbeaten run. With Sam Masters and Max Fricke representing Edinburgh in the Premier Pairs while Craig Cook was at practice for the British GP. Edinburgh won in a last heat decider against Somerset in a re-match from the season before, Sam Masters and Craig Cook had to get a 5–1 in heat 15 against Nick Morris and Pontus Aspregen. Edinburgh were on a 5–1 until Aspegren put the bike down to try to get a rerun. But there was no chance Morris would catch the home pair, with the title heading back to Scotland.

The 2015 Monarchs topped their qualifying section in the League Cup before seeing off Ipswich in the semi-finals to progress on to defeat Glasgow on aggregate in the Final. They just missed out on the KO Cup to Somerset, however made up for this by securing the Premier League Fours. The Monarchs topped the Premier League after the regular season and went on to retain their title with another aggregate victory over Glasgow in the Premier League Championship Final.

Since then it hasn't been as easy going for the Monarchs. In 2016 team building saw Edinburgh keep Masters, Erik Riss, Clegg and Wölbert from the 2015 league winners. With Craig Cook and Justin Sedgmen both going Elite League only. Rob Branford also moving on. With Edinburgh signing newcomer Jye Etheridge (replaced by Erik's brother Mark) and Dan Bewley. Along with the return of club legend Ryan Fisher. Edinburgh exited the League Cup in group stage with a home defeat to Berwick being the killer for the Monarchs. They exited the KO Cup in the quarter final to the hands of bitter rivals Glasgow. Edinburgh qualified for the Playoffs. They faced Ipswich in the quarter-finals, but made the task as tough as they could really after a 26-point deficit ahead of the second leg at Armadale but with only 16 points pulled back it was the end of the season for the Monarchs. In the Premier League 4's Edinburgh got knocked out in the semi-finals by 1 point. In the Pairs Edinburgh represented by Masters and Fisher, were runners up to hosts Somerset. Edinburgh in the Premier League Riders Championship were represented by Sam Masters, who came second.

In 2017 again it was a season of change for Edinburgh Ryan Fisher retired from British racing, Dan Bewley moving on due to Belle Vue riding a Friday and Kevin Wölbert all moving on. Masters, Erik and Mark Riss and Max Clegg re-signing. Mitchell Davey returned to Edinburgh for the first time since a horrible injury in 2013 at Sheffield. Newcomer Josh Pickering and Armadale specialist Ricky swells completed the team. Edinburgh exited the KO Cup to Sheffield at the earliest opportunity to Sheffield. Edinburgh came close to a semi-final in the Pairs but missed out by a point. In the Championship Riders Individual. Sam Masters won his first ride but had machinery issues after that, Ricky Wells made the semi-final but came at the back in the semi-final. In the 4s Edinburgh faced a tough task without Sam Masters who got a broken collarbone the night before, and were eliminated early on.
Edinburgh again qualified for the playoffs, again faced Ipswich and again came up short.

Season summary (1st team)

Season summary (juniors)

Previous riders by season

2006 team

2007 team

Also Rode

2008 team

2009 team

Also rode:

2010 team

Also Rode:

2011 team

Also rode

2012 team

Also Rode

2013 team

Also rode

Signed but failed to obtain necessary paperwork

2014 team

2015 team

2016 team

Also rode 

2017 team

2018 team

Also Rode

2019 team

Also Rode

2021 team

2022 team

 (C)

Team honours
Premier League Champions: 2003, 2008, 2010, 2014, 2015
Premier Trophy Winners: 2008, 2014, 2015
Premier League Knockout Cup Winners: 1997, 1999, 2014
Premier League Four-Team Championship Winners: 1981,1993, 2013, 2015
Premier League Pairs Championship Winners: 2014
National League Knockout Cup Winners: 1981
National League Pairs Winners: 1986
Scottish Cup Winners: 1951, 1964, 1967, 1968, 1969, 1977, 1984, 1985, 1988, 1989, 1992, 1997, 1999, 2000, 2001, 2002, 2003, 2004, 2006, 2007, 2008, 2010
Queen's Cup Winners: 1953
North Shield Winners: 1951

Individual Honours
Championships won while an Edinburgh Monarchs rider.

World Championship
 Jack Young – 1951 – The first second division rider to become Speedway World Champion

Premier League Riders' Championship
 Peter Carr – 1997
 Craig Cook – 2012

Scottish Championship
 Jack Young – 1949, 1950, 1951
 Dick Campbell – 1952
 Doug Templeton – 1960, 1962
 George Hunter – 1964
 Bill Landels – 1966
 Peter Carr – 1997, 1999, 2000, 2002
 Andrew Tully – 2012
 Craig Cook – 2013
 Sam Masters – 2014

Australian Solo Championship
 Sam Masters – 2017

Australian Under-21 Championship
 Max Fricke – 2013, 2014

South Australian Championship
 Mark Fiora 1982, 1983

Victorian Championship
 Sam Masters – 2015
Victorian Champion 1967/68 Bert Harkins.Scotland

Victorian Under-21 Championship
 Robert Branford – 2015

References

Speedway Premier League teams
SGB Championship teams
Sports teams in Edinburgh
Sport in West Lothian
1928 establishments in Scotland
Sports clubs established in 1928
Organisations based in West Lothian